Hellen Mubanga (born 23 May 1995) is a Zambian footballer who plays as a forward for Spanish Primera Federación club Zaragoza CFF and the Zambia women's national team.

Club career
Mubanga played for Bauleni Sports Academy and Red Arrows in Zambia and for Zaragoza CFF in Spain.

International career
Mubanga was part of the team at the 2014 African Women's Championship and the 2018 Africa Women Cup of Nations.

References

External links
Hellen Mubanga at BDFútbol

1995 births
Living people
Sportspeople from Lusaka
Zambian women's footballers
Women's association football forwards
Zaragoza CFF players
Segunda Federación (women) players
Zambia women's international footballers
Footballers at the 2020 Summer Olympics
Olympic footballers of Zambia
Zambian expatriate footballers
Zambian expatriates in Spain
Expatriate women's footballers in Spain